Oreochromis macrochir (longfin tilapia, greenhead tilapia, or greenhead bream) is a species of cichlid native to the Zambezi Basin,  Lake Mweru, and Lake Bangweulu.  It has been used extensively for stocking ponds and dams in other parts of southern Africa, but is little-used elsewhere.
In Lake Mweru, it is economically the most important fish.  The fish was introduced into Lake Alaotra in Madagascar in 1954, and proliferated quickly. By 1957, it provided 46% of the catch, perhaps because it was moving into an empty ecological niche as a phytophagous species.

References

macrochir
Freshwater fish of Central Africa
Fish of Mozambique
Fish described in 1912